Gullmarn, also known as Gullmarsfjorden or Gullmaren, is a threshold fjord in the middle of Bohuslän Archipelago on the west coast of Sweden. The name "Gullmarn" means "God's sea" and comes from Old Norse. At its northern end the fjord branches into the Färlev and Saltkälle fjords.

Its shoreline has steep rock walls marked by many valleys containing streams and rivers. Deeply cut ravines are typical and steep cliffs alternate with sandy beaches and meadows.

The fjord was designated as Sweden's first marine conservation area in 1983. Because of the varying depths of the fjord the marine wildlife is abundant and diverse. There are many unique marine animals that are not found in the more shallow areas of the fjord. The shallow waters also provide habitat for a broad range of bird species. Three scientific research stations have been established in the conservation area.

See also 
Brofjorden
Stora Bornö

References

External links 

Gullmarn at Västra Götaland County 

Västra Götaland County
Fjords of Sweden
Nature reserves in Sweden